John Pineda (born July 2, 1982) is a Canadian freestyle wrestler.

Career 
Pineda won a bronze medal at the 2008 Pan American Championships. He participated in four World Wrestling Championships, finishing 13th in 2010 and 2013. In 2015, he won the bronze medal at the Grand Prix of Paris and a gold medal at the Gramma Cup in Havana. He was expected to compete at the 2015 Pan American Games but did not make weight and had to withdraw from the event.

References 

Canadian male sport wrestlers
Living people
1982 births
Wrestlers at the 2015 Pan American Games
Pan American Games competitors for Canada